The tensor veli palatini muscle (tensor palati or tensor muscle of the velum palatinum) is a broad, thin, ribbon-like muscle in the head that tenses the soft palate.

Structure 
The tensor veli palatini is found anterior-lateral to the levator veli palatini muscle.

It arises by a flat lamella from the scaphoid fossa at the base of the medial pterygoid plate, from the spina angularis of the sphenoid and from the lateral wall of the cartilage of the auditory tube.

Descending vertically between the medial pterygoid plate and the medial pterygoid muscle, it ends in a tendon which winds around the pterygoid hamulus, being retained in this situation by some of the fibers of origin of the medial pterygoid muscle.

Between the tendon and the hamulus is a small bursa.

The tendon then passes medially and is inserted into the palatine aponeurosis and into the surface behind the transverse ridge on the horizontal part of the palatine bone.

Nerve supply 
The tensor veli palatini muscle is supplied by the mandibular nerve (CN V3). This is the third branch of the trigeminal nerve (CN V). It is the only muscle of the palate not innervated by the pharyngeal plexus, which is formed by the vagal and glossopharyngeal nerves.

Function 
The tensor veli palatini tenses the soft palate and by doing so, assists the levator veli palatini in elevating the palate to occlude and prevent entry of food into the nasopharynx during swallowing.  The tensed palate consequently provides a stable platform for elevation of the pharynx during swallowing by the pharyngeal muscles.  Since it is also attached to the lateral cartilaginous lamina of the auditory tube (also known as the Eustachian tube), it assists in its opening during swallowing or yawning to allow air pressure to equalize between the tympanic cavity and the outside air. Equalization of air pressure in the tympanic cavity is essential for preventing damage to the tympanic membrane and a resulting loss of hearing acuity.

Additional images

See also 

 Levator veli palatini

References

External links 

Muscles of the head and neck
Pharynx